is a Japanese idol girl group formed in 2014. The group is themed around illustrating, cosplay, and voice acting. The group was originally managed by the illustration website Pixiv as a part of the  before passing to Dear Stage.

Members

Akagumi (Red Team)

Aogumi (Blue Team)

Former members

Timeline

Blue (vertical) = Digital singles
Red (vertical) = Major singles
Green (vertical) = Studio albums

Discography

Albums

Singles

References

External links
Niji no Conquistador at Oricon 
Niji no Conquistador at JPU Records 

Japanese girl groups
Japanese idol groups
Musical groups established in 2014
2014 establishments in Japan